Tambunan is the capital of the Tambunan District in the Interior Division of Sabah, Malaysia. Its population was estimated to be around 35,667 in 2010. It is located 80 kilometres east of the state capital, Kota Kinabalu (to which is connected by the Kota Kinabalu-Tambunan-Keningau Highway), 48 kilometres south of Ranau and 48 kilometres north of Keningau. At an average altitude of 750 metres, this valley town, which is part of the Crocker Range, experiences a mild tropical climate all year long. The valley is peppered with terraced paddy fields and 70 villages. The dense forests of bamboo around Tambunan town are a legacy of the British colonial period, during which an edict stated that 20 bamboo sprouts had to be planted for every bamboo cut.

Etymology 
The name of this area is taken from the word "Tamadon" and "Gombunan" which combined into "Tambunan".

Demographics 

According to the last census in 2010, the population of the district is estimated to be around 35,667 inhabitants. The district of Tambunan is populated mainly by the indigenous group of Kadazan-Dusun (86%), while the rest of the population are Malay, Chinese and other indigenous groups.

Gallery

Attractions 

The Mat Salleh Memorial, located in the middle of paddy fields at Kampung Tibabar (Tibabar Village), is a concrete structure erected by the state government in memory of Datu Paduka Mat Salleh. Better known as Mat Salleh, he led a rebellion against the British North Borneo Company in the late 19th century in response to the locals' dissatisfaction with alleged exploitation by the company. He was killed in a gun battle with the British police on 1 February 1900. The memorial was erected on the spot where Mat Salleh was killed after Sabah became part of Malaysia.

Tambunan is noted for the quality of its lihing and tapai. These are rice wines traditionally made by the Kadazan and Dusun peoples of Sabah. Just outside the town is the Rafflesia Forest Reserve, devoted to the world's largest flower, the Rafflesia. East of Tambunan is Sabah's second highest mountain, Trus Madi (2642 metres).

Other than that, here is a list of few places that you can visit in Tambunan;
 Mahua Waterfall
 Tambunan Village Resort Club
 Sinurambi Tambunan
 Sungai Pampang
 Golf Club
 Batu Gong

Economy 

Tambunan is an agricultural based district. Most of the citizen of Tambunan earn their living through the plantation of paddy, vegetables, fish farm, rubber plantation, palm oil plantation, working as public servant and so on.
As of 2021, there is no big industry in Tambunan. This is mainly due to the location of Tambunan which is a bit far from Kota Kinabalu and also it was shadowed by Keningau which is a larger City around 40 km from Tambunan.

Tambunan host the only Kilang Tapai (Rice wine Factory) in Sabah.
Tambunan also known for large plantation of ginger in the state in which the plantation mostly located at Kampung Tikolod Tambunan.

Climate

Politics 
 Parti Bersatu Sabah (PBS) was established in Tambunan in 1985.
 Pairin Kitingan who was the Chief Minister of Sabah from 1985 to 1994 and the former president of PBS is a Tambunan native.
 Parti Solidariti Tanah Airku (STAR) was established in Tambunan in 2016.
 Jeffery Kitingan who is the current Deputy Chief Minister II (2020-now) and president of STAR is a Tambunan Native
 Maximus Johnity Ongkili who is the current Minister in Prime Minister's Department of Sabah & Sarawak and the current Parti Bersatu Sabah president is a Tambunan Native

References

Further reading

External links 

  Tambunan District Council
  Tambunan District Office

Tambunan District
Towns in Sabah